Gabriel Omar Carabalí Quiñonez (born June 12, 1997), known as Omar Carabalí, is a footballer who plays as goalkeeper for club Unión La Calera on loan from Colo-Colo. Born in Ecuador, Carabalí represents Chile internationally.

Career

Colo-Colo
On 2013, he arrived to Colo-Colo from Ecuadorian club Independiente del Valle. He signed his first contract as professional player on 2015 at the age of 18 years being only considered as a substitute on some matches.

San Luis de Quillota
He was loaned to San Luis de Quillota for all 2020 season.

International career
He was called up for Ecuador U20 to play at the 2017 South American U20 Championship and 2017 FIFA U20 World Cup, but he didn't play any match. So, after his nationalization by permanent residency according to Chilean law, he decided to play for Chile national team. 

He played four matches for Chile U23 at the 2020 Pre-Olympic Tournament, but Chile didn't advance to the second stage. He was later called up for a training microcycle by Chile national team's coach, Reinaldo Rueda. 

He received his first call up to the Chile senior team to play the 2022 FIFA World Cup qualification matches against Uruguay and Colombia on 8 and 13 October 2020 respectively, but he didn't make his international debut at senior level.

Personal life
He is the son of Wilson Carabalí, a former Ecuadorian international footballer, and brother of Wilson Carabalí Jr., who came to Chile along with him looking for an opportunity in Chilean football too. Also, his father is cousin of the former Ecuadorian international footballer Héctor Carabalí.

Honours

Club
Colo-Colo
 Primera División (2): 2015-A, 2017-Transición
 Copa Chile (2): 2016, 2019

References

External links
 
 Omar Carabalí at sanluissa.cl

Living people
1997 births
Chilean footballers
Chile youth international footballers
Ecuadorian footballers
Ecuador youth international footballers
Ecuadorian emigrants to Chile
Chilean Primera División players
Naturalized citizens of Chile
Colo-Colo footballers
San Luis de Quillota footballers
Association football goalkeepers